Rodriguezia candida is a species of orchid native to Venezuela, Brazil, French Guiana, Suriname.

References

External links 

candida
Orchids of South America
Plants described in 1837